Prasophyllum innubum, commonly known as the Brandy Mary's leek orchid, is a species of orchid endemic to a small region of New South Wales. It has a single tubular, bright green leaf and up to twenty brownish-green, white and purplish flowers. It is a very rare orchid with only about four hundred plants known.

Description
The flowers are brownish-green, white and purplish and as with others in the genus, are inverted so that the labellum is above the column rather than below it. The edges of the labellum are wavy and there is a green or whitish callus in its centre. Flowering occurs in January and February.

Taxonomy and naming
Prasophyllum innubum was first formally described in 2007 by David Jones and the description was published in The Orchadian from a specimen collected near Brandy Marys in the Bago State Forest near Blowering. The specific epithet (innubum) is a Latin word meaning "unmarried".

Distribution and habitat
Brandy Mary's leek orchid grows on stream edges in a small area near Cabramurra and Talbingo.

Conservation
Prasophyllum innubum is listed as "Critically Endangered" under the Commonwealth Government Environment Protection and Biodiversity Conservation Act 1999 (EPBC) Act and the New South Wales Threatened Species Conservation Act 1995. The main threats to the population are logging, changes in drainage patterns due to dam water storage, grazing by livestock, feral horses and pigs and weed invasion. The population is not in a conservation reserve.

References

External links 
 

innubum
Flora of New South Wales
Endemic orchids of Australia
Plants described in 2007